Novogolskoye is a rural locality (a selo) and the administrative center of Novogolskoye Rural Settlement, Gribanovsky District, Voronezh Oblast, Russia. The population was 709 as of 2010. There are 10 streets.

Geography 
Novogolskoye is located 51 km west of Gribanovsky (the district's administrative centre) by road. Zarechye is the nearest rural locality.

References 

Rural localities in Gribanovsky District